Jockey Hill is a ridge located in the Catskill Mountains of New York northeast of Stony Hollow. Gallis Hill is located south-southwest, and Halihan Hill is located east of Jockey Hill.

References

Mountains of Ulster County, New York
Mountains of New York (state)